"Fardado" (Uniformed) is a single by Brazilian rock band Titãs, released in 2014. It is the first single of their fourteenth album Nheengatu as well as the album's opening track. A short preview of the track was released in April 2014, when the album became available for pre-order.

The track criticizes the police and is viewed by some as an update to their 1986 hit "Polícia", off their Cabeça Dinossauro album.

Lyrics 
The song's introductory verse ("Você também é explorado - fardado!", which can be translated as "You are also exploited - uniformed (guy)!") was inspired by a sign seen amidst the 2013 protests in Brazil, held by a woman in front of a battalion of the military police, a sign that read: "Fardado, você também é explorado" ("Uniformed, you are also exploited).

Commenting on the track's resemblance to "Polícia", guitarist Tony Bellotto said that they have similar critics, but with different focuses. He explained:

Keyboardist, bassist, vocalist and co-writer Sérgio Britto said that the idea of the song is to focus on the fact that police officers are also victims of exploitation and, as such, should refrain from repressing demonstrations of other exploited people.

In another interview, he stated:

In his personal blog, he wrote a letter of clarification in response to people criticizing the band for supposedly supporting crime or willing to gratuitously depreciate the institution's image.

Music video 
The single received a video, directed by Oscar Rodrigues Alves, who also co-directed the documentary Titãs – A Vida Até Parece Uma Festa, about the band's history. In the video, the members of the band are seen with clown make ups, in reference to the way people feel about their rights. The theme was a suggestion of Alves himself, who wanted the video to show a not so obvious interpretation of the lyrics, that is, a video with no direct references to the 2013 protests.

Track listing

Personnel 
 Sérgio Britto - lead vocals
 Paulo Miklos - guitar, backing vocals
 Tony Bellotto - guitar
 Branco Mello - bass, backing vocals

Session member
 Mario Fabre - drums

References

External links 
 

2014 singles
Titãs songs
Songs about the military
2014 songs
Songs written by Sérgio Britto
Songs written by Paulo Miklos